The 2017–18 New Zealand Football Championship season (currently known as the ISPS Handa Premiership for sponsorship reasons) was the fourteenth season of the NZFC since its establishment in 2004. Ten teams competed in the competition with Team Wellington and Auckland City representing the ISPS Handa Premiership in the 2018 OFC Champions League after finishing Champions and Premiers respectively in the 2016–17 competition.

Clubs

Kits

Regular season

League table

Positions by round

Notes:
 Auckland City and Team Wellington played their Round 8 game early on 15 October 2017, and had an extra game played between Rounds 1 and 7.
 Canterbury United were tied with Waitakere United at the end of Round 1.
 Hawke's Bay United were tied with Wellington Phoenix Reserves at the end of Round 1.
 Auckland City and Eastern Suburbs had a game in hand between Rounds 7 and 12, with their Round 7 game played before the start of Round 13 on 24 January 2018.
 Wellington Phoenix and Canterbury United had a game in hand between Rounds 4 and 14, with their Round 4 game played before the start of Round 15 on 11 February 2018.
 Auckland City beat Tasman United 3–1 in round 9, however it was ruled by NZ Football that they had played an ineligible player so forfeited the result. This meant the win was awarded as a 3–0 result to Tasman.

Fixtures and results
The 2017–18 season sees every team play the other both home and away. The Round 7 and round 8 matches between Team Wellington and Eastern Suburbs vs Auckland City have been moved due to Auckland City playing at 2017 FIFA Club World Cup at the start of December. The match between Wellington Phoenix Reserves and Canterbury United was postponed till 
February 2018 due to New Zealand playing their intercontinental playoff against Peru that same day in Wellington.

Round 8 (rescheduled)

Round 1

Round 2

Round 3

Round 4

Round 5

Round 6

Round 7

Round 8

Round 9

* Auckland City beat Tasman United 3–1 however it was ruled by NZ Football that they had played an ineligible player so forfeited the result. This meant the win was awarded as a 3–0 result to Tasman United.

Round 10

Round 11

Round 12

Round 7 (rescheduled)

Round 13

Round 14

Round 4 (rescheduled)

Round 15 (split round)

Round 16 (split round)

Round 17

Round 18

Finals series

Semi-finals

Grand final

Statistics

Top scorers

1 Transferred to Maccabi Hakoah in Australia, 5 March 2018.
2 Transferred to FC Gifu in Japan, 17 January 2018.

Hat-tricks

Own goals

References

External links
 ISPS Handa Premiership website

New Zealand Football Championship seasons
2017–18 in New Zealand association football
New Zealand Football Championship
New Zealand Football Championship